Sanders Unified School District is a school district in the community of Sanders in Apache County in the US state of Arizona.

The district operates three schools, Sanders Elementary School (K-5), Sanders Middle School (grades 6–8) and Valley High School.

In addition to Sanders, Houck, Lupton, and Wide Ruins are in the district.

References

External links

School districts in Apache County, Arizona